Rumor is an important form of social communications, and the spread of rumors plays a significant role in a variety of human affairs. There are two approaches to investigate the rumor spreading process: the microscopic models and the macroscopic models.
The macroscopic models propose a macro view about this process are mainly based on the widely used Daley-Kendall and Maki-Thompson models. Particularly, we can view rumor spread as a stochastic process in social networks.
While the microscopic models are more interested more on the micro interactions between individuals.

Rumor propagation Models 
In the last few years, there has been a growing interest in rumor propagation in Online social networks problems where different approaches have been proposed to investigate it.
By carefully scrutinizing the existing literature, we categorize the works into macroscopic and microscopic approaches.

Macroscopic models 
The first category is mainly based on the Epidemic models  where  the pioneering research engaging rumor propagation under these models started during the 1960s.

Epidemic models
A standard model of rumor spreading was introduced by Daley and Kendall,. Assume there are N people in total. And those people in the network are categorized into three groups: ignorants, spreaders and stiflers, which are denoted as S, I, and R respectively hereinafter:

I: people who are ignorant of the rumor;
S: people who actively spread the rumor;
R: people who have heard the rumor, but no longer are interested in spreading it.

The rumor is propagated through the population by pair-wise contacts between spreaders and others in the population. Any spreader involved in a pair-wise meeting attempts to “infect” the other individual with the rumor. In the case this other individual is an ignorant, he or she becomes a spreader. In the other two cases, either one or both of those involved in the meeting learn that the rumor is known and decided not to tell the rumor anymore, thereby turning into stiflers.

One variant is the Maki-Thompson model. In this model, rumor is spread by directed contacts of the spreaders with others in the population. Furthermore, when a spreader contacts another spreader only the initiating spreader becomes a stifler. Therefore, three types of interactions can happen with certain rates. 

which says when a spreader meet an ignorant, the ignorant will become a spreader. 

which says when two spreaders meet with each other, one of them will become a stifler.

which says when a spreader meet a stifler, the spreader will lose the interest in spreading the rumor, so become a stifler.

Of course we always have conservation of individuals:

The change in each class in a small time interval is:

which we can write

Compared with the ordinary SIR model, we see that the only difference to the ordinary SIR model is that we have a factor  in the first equation instead of just . Also, if

which means

the rumour model exhibits an “epidemic” even for arbitrarily small rate parameters.

Epidemic models in social network 
We model the process introduced above on a network in discrete time, that is, we can model it as a DTMC. Say we have a network with N nodes, then we can define  to be the state of node i at time t. At a single moment, some node i and node j interact with each other, and then one of them will change its state. The transition matrix depends on the number of ties of node i and node j, as well as the state of node i and node j. For any , we try to find . If node i is in state I and node j is in state S, then ; if node i is in state I and node j is in state I, then ; if node i is in state I and node j is in state R, then . For all other , .      
The procedure on a network is as follows:

We would expect that this process spreads the rumor throughout a considerable fraction of the network. Note however that if we have a strong local clustering around a node, what can happen is that many nodes become spreaders and have neighbors who are spreaders. Then, every time we pick one of those, they will recover and can extinguish the rumor spread. On the other hand, if we have a network that is small world, that is, a network in which the shortest path between two randomly chosen nodes is much smaller than that one would expect, we can expect the rumor spread far away.

Also we can compute the final number of people who once spread the news, this is given by
 
In networks the process that does not have a threshold in a well mixed population, exhibits a clear cut phase-transition in small worlds.

Microscopic models 
The microscopic approaches attracted more attention in the individual's interaction: "who influenced whom."
The known models in this category are the information cascade and the linear threshold models, the energy model, HISBmodel  and Galam's Model.

Independent cascades models

Linear threshold models

Energy model

HISBmodel model 
The HISBmodel is a rumor propagation model that can reproduce a  trend of this phenomenon and provide indicators to assess the impact of the rumor to effectively understand the diffusion process and reduce its influence.
The variety that exists in human nature makes their decision-making ability pertaining to spreading information unpredictable, which is the primary challenge to model such a complex phenomenon.
Hence, this model considers the impact of human individual and social behaviors in the spreading process of the rumors.
The HISBmodel proposes an approach that is parallel to other models in the literature and concerned more with how individuals spread rumors.
Therefore,  it try to understand the behavior of individuals, as well as their social interactions in OSNs, and highlight their impact on the dissemination of rumors.
Thus, the model, attempts to answer the following question: ``When does an individual spread a rumor? When does an individual accept rumors? In which OSN does this individual spread the rumors?''.
First, it proposes a formulation of individual behavior towards a rumor analog to damped harmonic motion, which incorporates the opinions of individuals in the propagation process.
Furthermore, it establishes rules of rumor transmission between individuals.
As a result, it presents the HISBmodel propagation process, where new metrics are introduced to accurately assess the impact of a rumor spreading through OSNs.

References 

Social networks